The 1984–85 season was the 86th completed season of The Football League.

Final league tables and results 

The tables and results below are reproduced here in the exact form that they can be found at The Rec.Sport.Soccer Statistics Foundation website, with home and away statistics separated.

During the first five seasons of the league, that is, until the season 1893–94, re-election process concerned the clubs which finished in the bottom four of the league. From the 1894–95 season and until the 1920–21 season the re-election process was required of the clubs which finished in the bottom three of the league. From the 1922–23 season on it was required of the bottom two teams of both Third Division North and Third Division South. Since the Fourth Division was established in the 1958–59 season, the re-election process has concerned the bottom four clubs in that division.

First Division

Howard Kendall’s Everton side beat neighbours Liverpool to the league championship, while Tottenham Hotspur and Manchester United followed closely behind. Howard Kendall's team also collected the Cup Winners' Cup. Southampton completed the top five, but long-serving manager Lawrie McMenemy then delivered a major surprise by resigning as manager to take over at relegated Sunderland.

The season marked the return of Sheffield Wednesday to the First Division after 14 years away, Newcastle United after six years away, and Chelsea after five years. All three sides secured First Division survival comfortably. 

Stoke City finished bottom of the First Division with just three league wins all season and just 17 points – a record low under the 3 points for a win system in any division, which would stand for twenty-one years. Norwich City and Sunderland – the two League Cup finalists – occupied the two other relegation places.

Liverpool manager Joe Fagan retired after the season and striker Kenny Dalglish was appointed player-manager.

The First Division's leading scorers this season were Gary Lineker at Leicester City and Kerry Dixon at Chelsea, with both players scoring 24 league goals.

Final table

First Division results

Managerial changes

First Division maps

Second Division

Jim Smith’s Oxford United side won a successive promotion as Second Division champions and reached the First Division after just 23 years as Football League members. Following them into the big time were Birmingham City and Manchester City.

Slipping out of the league’s second tier were Cardiff City, joined by Notts County and Wolverhampton Wanderers – both relegated for the second season in succession. Veteran manager Tommy Docherty had tried his hand at reversing financially troubled Wolves’ rapid decline at Molineux, but without success.

Second Division results

Second Division maps

Third Division

Bradford City’s Third Division championship glory was overshadowed on the final day of the season when a fire at their Valley Parade ground killed 56 spectators – including two followers of their opponents Lincoln City.

The other two promotion places in the Third Division were occupied by Millwall and Hull City.

Going down from the Third Division were Cambridge United (who won just four games all season), Orient, Burnley and Preston North End. Burnley and Preston were founder members of the Football League who had reached great heights in the past – just 25 years ago Burnley had been league champions. Those successes were now very much a distant memory as both clubs slid into the league's fourth tier for the first time.

Swansea City, who had finished sixth in the First Division just three years earlier, continued to suffer as a result of their financial problems as they narrowly avoided a third successive relegation.

Results

Third Division maps

Fourth Division

Chesterfield, Blackpool, Darlington and Bury were promoted to the Third Division after occupying the Fourth Division's top four places.

The bottom four clubs, Halifax Town, Stockport County, Northampton Town (who had spent a season in the First Division some 20 years earlier) and Torquay United, all retained their league status after a successful re-election campaign at the expense of Alliance Premier League side Bath City who were placed 4th in the Alliance Premier League and were the highest placed team there that would have met the Football League's requirements. Re-election results are given at the end of this article.

Results

Fourth Division maps

Election/Re-election to the Football League

This year Wealdstone, the winners of the Alliance Premier League, could not apply for election because they did not meet Football League requirements. 2nd placed Nuneaton could not apply either for the same reasons, and neither could 3rd placed Dartford, so 4th placed Bath City won the right to apply for election to the Football League to replace one of the four bottom sides in the 1984–85 Football League Fourth Division. The vote went as follows:

As a result of this, all four Football League teams were re-elected, and Bath City were denied membership of the Football League.

See also
 1984-85 in English football

References
Ian Laschke: Rothmans Book of Football League Records 1888–89 to 1978–79. Macdonald and Jane's, London & Sydney, 1980.

 
English Football League seasons